The article provides an overview of the entire chain of command and organization of the Italian Air Force as of 1 January 2018 and includes all currently active units. The Armed Forces of Italy are under the command of the Italian Supreme Defense Council, presided over by the President of the Italian Republic. The Italian Air Force is commanded by the Chief of the Air Force General Staff or "Capo di Stato Maggiore dell’Aeronautica Militare" in Rome.

The source for this article is the booklet "L’ORDINAMENTO IN AERONAUTICA MILITARE", which is published every year by the Air Force General Staff for the students of the Air Force Academy. The booklet for 2017–2018 in PDF-format can be found at on the website of the Italian Air Force

Chief of the Air Force General Staff 
The Chief of the Air Force General Staff heads the Air Force General Staff in Rome, manages the operational aspects of the air force, and supervises four major commands.
 Capo di Stato Maggiore Aeronautica Militare (Chief of the Air Force General Staff - CaSMA), in Rome
 Air Force General Staff, in Rome
 Comando della Squadra Aerea (Air Fleet Command - CSA), in Rome
 Comando Logistico dell'AM (Air Force Logistic Command - CLOG AM), in Rome
 Comando 1ª Regione Aerea (1st (North Italy) Air Region Command - 1ªRA), in Milan
 Comando delle Scuole dell’AM/3ª Regione Aerea (Air Force Schools Command - 3rd (South Italy) Air Region - CSAM/3ªRA), in Bari

Air Force General Staff 
The following offices report directly to the Chief of the Air Force General Staff.

 Chief of the Air Force General
 Ufficio Generale del Capo di SMA (Main Office of the Chief of the Air Force General Staff)
 Segreteria Particolare del Capo di SMA (Special Secretariat of the Chief of the Air Force General Staff)
 Direzione per l’Impiego del Personale Militare dell’Aeronautica (Air Force Military Personnel Employment Directorate - DIPMA)
 Ufficio Generale di Coordinamento della Prevenzione Antinfortunistica e della Tutela Ambientale (Accident Prevention and Environmental Protection Main Coordination Office - UCOPRATA)
 Ufficio Generale di Coordinamento della Vigilanza Antinfortunistica (Accident Vigilance Main Coordination Office - UCOVA)
 Ufficio Generale Centro di Responsabilità Amministrativa – Aeronautica Militare (Administrative Responsibility Center Main Office - Air Force - UCRA-AM)
 Ispettorato per la Sicurezza del Volo (Flight Safety Inspectorate - ISV)
 Istituto Superiore per la Sicurezza del Volo (Higher Flight Safety Institute - ISSV)
 Ufficio del Generale del Ruolo delle Armi (General of the Arms Office)
 Capo del Corpo del Genio Aeronautico (Air Force Engineer Corps Chief)
 Capo del Corpo di Commissariato Aeronautico (Air Force Commissariat Corps Chief)
 Capo del Corpo Sanitario Aeronautico (Air Force Medical Corps Chief)
 Commissioni di Avanzamento e la Segreteria Permanente (Advancement Commissions and )
 Segreteria Permanente Commissione Superiore Avanzamento (Permanent Secretariat Higher Promotion Commission)
 Commissione Ordinaria Avanzamento Ufficiali (Officers Promotion Commission)
 Commissione Permanente Avanzamento Marescialli dell'A.M. (Non-commissioned Officer Promotion Commission)
 Commissione Permanente Avanzamento Sergenti dell'A.M. (Sergeants Promotion Commission)
 Commissione Permanente Avanzamento Volontari in S.P. dell'A.M. (Volunteers in Permanent Service Promotion Commission)
 Aiutante di Volo del Capo di SMA (Chief of SMA Flight Adjutant)
 Consulente Giuridico del Capo di SMA (Chief of SMA Legal Advisor)
 Consulente Tecnico Militare Problematiche d’Avanzamento (Technical-Military Consultant Promotion Problems)
 Presidente Capo dei Sottufficiali, Graduati e militari di Truppa per l’AM (Air Force Non-commissioned Officers, Graduates and Soldiers Chief President)
 Ufficio Vicario Episcopale per l’AM (Air Force Episcopal Vicar Office)
 Comando Carabinieri per l’AM (Air Force Carabinieri Command)

Deputy Chief of the Air Force General Staff 
The Deputy Chief of the Air Force General Staff manages the bureaucratic aspects of the Air Force.

 Sottocapo di Stato Maggiore Aeronautica Militare (Deputy Chief of the Air Force General Staff - SCaSMA)
 Ufficio del Sottocapo (Deputy Chief Office)
 Segreteria Particolare del SCaSMA (SCaSMA Special Secretariat)
 Ufficiale Addetto del SCaSMA (SCaSMA Adjutant)
 1° Reparto "Ordinamento e Personale" (1st Department "Regulations and Personnel" - SMA-ORD)
 3° Reparto "Pianificazione dello Strumento Aerospaziale" (3rd Department "Planning of the Aeroespacial Instrument" - SMA-PIANI)
 Centro di Eccellenza per Aeromobili a Pilotaggio Remoto (CDE APR) (Center of Excellence for Remotely Piloted Aircraft), at Amendola Air Base
 4° Reparto "Logistica" (4th Department "Logistics" - SMA-LOG)
 5° Reparto "Comunicazione" (5th Department "Communications" - SMA-COM)
 6° Reparto "Affari Economici e Finanziari" (6th Department "Economic and Financial Affairs" - SMA-FIN))
 Reparto Generale Sicurezza (General Security Department - SMA-SEC)
 Centro Coordinamento Sicurezza (Security Coordination Center), at Rome Ciampino Airport
 33x Nuclei Sicurezza (33x Security Squads)
 Ufficio Generale per lo Spazio (Space Main Office - SMA-SPAZIO)
 Ufficio Generale per la Circolazione Aerea Militare (Military Air Traffic Main Office - SMAUCAM)
 Ufficio Generale Consulenza e Affari Giuridici Aeronautica Militare (Air Force Counsel and Legal Affairs Main Office - SMAUCAG)
 Ufficio Generale per l'Innovazione Manageriale (Managerial Innovation Main Office - SMA-UIM)

Air Force Command Rome 
The Air Force Command Rome (COMAER), in Centocelle Airport has territorial and liaison functions for the city of Rome and provides administrative support to the air force headquarter and units based at Centocelle Airport and Vigna di Valle Airport.

 Comando Aeronautica Militare Roma (Air Force Command Rome - COMAER), at Centocelle Airport
 Comando Supporti Enti di Vertice (Higher Commands Support Command - COMSEV), at Centocelle Airport
 Distaccamento Aeronautico Terminillo (Aeronautical Detachment Terminillo), in Monte Terminillo
 Comando Aeroporto di Centocelle / Quartier Generale del COMAER (Centocelle Air Base Command - COMAER Headquarter), at Centocelle Airport
 Comando Aeroporto Vigna di Valle / Centro Storiografico e Sportivo dell’AM (Vigna di Valle Air Base Command / Air Force History & Sport Center), at Vigna di Valle Airport
 Museo Storico (History Museum)
 Centro Sportivo (Sport Center)
 Gruppo Servizi Generali (General Services Squadron)
 Plotone Protezione delle Forze (Force Protection Platoon)

Aviation Inspector for the Navy 

The Ispettore dell’Aviazione per la Marina (Aviation Inspector for the Navy - ISPAVIAMAR) reports to the Chief of the Air Force General Staff and the Chief of the Navy General Staff. ISPAVIAMAR oversees the technical and logistic aeronautical aspects, and the training of the Italian military's airborne anti-submarine forces. The inspector is a brigadier general of the air force, whose office and staff reside in the navy's headquarter in Rome. The only unit assigned to ISPAVIAMAR is the 41° Stormo AntiSom Athos Ammannato, which is under operational control of the Italian Navy.

 Chief of the Air Force General Staff / Chief of the Navy General Staff
 Aviation Inspector for the Navy - ISPAVIAMAR
  41° Stormo AntiSom "Athos Ammannato" (41st (Anti-submarine) Wing), at Sigonella Air Base
 86° Gruppo CAE (86th Crew Training Squadron)
 88° Gruppo AntiSom (88th Anti-submarine Squadron) with 4× P-72A ASW
 441° Gruppo Servizi Tecnico-Operativi (441st Technical Services Squadron)
 541° Gruppo Servizi Logistico-Operativi (541st Logistic Services Squadron)
 941° Gruppo Efficienza Aeromobili (941st Maintenance Squadron)
 Gruppo Protezione delle Forze (Force Protection Squadron)

Air Fleet Command 

The Air Fleet Command (Comando della Squadra Aerea or CSA) controls all operative units, the intelligence, electronic warfare capabilities and the operational headquarter of the air force. The CSA ensures that unit is equipped, trained and prepared for combat duty and controls them during combat operations.

 Air Fleet Command, at Centocelle Airport, in Rome
 Comando Operazioni Aeree (Air Operations Command), in Poggio Renatico
 Comando delle Forze da Combattimento (Combat Forces Command), in Milan
 Comando Forze per la Mobilità e il Supporto (Airlift and Support Forces Command), in Rome
 9ª Brigata Aerea ISTAR-EW (9th Intelligence, Surveillance, Target Acquisition, and Reconnaissance - Electronic Warfare (ISTAR-EW) Air Brigade), at Pratica di Mare Air Base
 1ª Brigata Aerea Operazioni Speciali (1st Special Operations Air Brigade), in Furbara Air Base
 Italian Air Force Delegation, at NATO's Tactical Leadership Programme (TLP), at Albacete Air Base (Spain)

Air Operations Command 
The Comando Operazioni Aeree (Air Operations Command - COA) conducts all operations of the Aeronautica Militare. COA controls all military radar installations in Italy and its Air Operations Center commands and controls the defence of Italy's air-space.

 Comando Operazioni Aeree (Air Operations Command - COA), in Poggio Renatico
 Italian Air Operations Center (ITA-AOC), in Poggio Renatico, reports to NATO's Integrated Air Defense System CAOC Torrejón in Spain
 Reparto Servizi Coordinamento e Controllo Aeronautica Militare (Air Force Coordination and Control Service Department - RSCCAM), at Ciampino Air Base (Air traffic management)
 Servizo Coordinamento e Controllo Aeronautica Militare Abano Terme
 Servizo Coordinamento e Controllo Aeronautica Militare Linate
 Servizo Coordinamento e Controllo Aeronautica Militare Brindisi
 Reparto Preparazione alle Operazioni (Operations Preparation Department - RPO), in Poggio Renatico
 Reparto Mobile Comando e Controllo (Mobile Command and Control Regiment - RMCC), at Bari Air Base (Air-transportable command and control post)
 Gruppo Sistemi TLC e, Comando e Controllo (Command and Control, and Telematic Systems Squadron)
 Gruppo Servizi di Supporto (Support Services Squadron)
 Reparto Supporto Servizi Generali (General Service Support Regiment - RSSG), in Poggio Renatico
 Gruppo Servizi Tecnico-Operativi (Technical Services Squadron)
 Gruppo Servizi Logistico-Operativi (Logistic Services Squadron)
 Gruppo Protezione delle Forze (Force Protection Squadron)
 Reparto Difesa Aerea Missilistica Integrata (Integrated Missile Air-defence Regiment - Rep. DAMI), in Poggio Renatico
 11° Gruppo DAMI (11th Integrated Missile Air-defence Squadron - 11° GrDAMI), in Poggio Renatico 
 22° Gruppo Radar Aeronautica Militare (22nd Air Force Radar Squadron - 22° GrRAM), in Licola
 Servizio Difesa Aerea (Air-defense Service)
 Servizio Tecnico Operativo (Technical Service)
 Servizio Logistico Operativo (Logistic Service)
 Compagnia Protezione delle Forze (Force Protection Company)
 Italian Air Force Delegation, at the French Air Force's Commandement de la défense aérienne et des opérations aériennes (CDAOA), in Paris (France)
 Italian Air Force Delegation, at NATO's European Air Transport Command (EATC) at Eindhoven Air Base (Netherlands)

9th ISTAR-EW Air Brigade 
 9th Intelligence, Surveillance, Target Acquisition and Reconnaissance - Electronic Warfare (ISTAR-EW) Air Brigade, at Pratica di Mare Air Base
 Comando Aeroporto di Pratica di Mare (Pratica di Mare Air Base Command)
 Reparto Tecnico-Operativo (Technical Services Regiment)
 Reparto Logistico-Operativo (Logistic Services Regiment)
 Gruppo Protezione delle Forze (Force Protection Squadron)
 Reparto Supporto Tecnico Operativo Guerra Elettronica (Electronic Warfare Technical-operational Support Regiment - ReSTOGE), at Pratica di Mare Air Base
 Gruppo Supporto Operativo (Operational Support Squadron)
 Gruppo Sistemi Difesa Aerospaziale (Air-space Defense Systems Squadron)
 Gruppo Supporto Tecnico (Technical Support Squadron)
 Reparto Addestramento Controllo Spazio Aereo (Air-space Control Training Regiment - RACSA), at Pratica di Mare Air Base
 Gruppo Addestramento Operativo Traffico Aereo (Air-traffic Training Squadron)
 Gruppo Addestramento Operativo Difesa Aerea (Air-defence Training Squadron)
 Gruppo Supporto Tecnico (Technical Support Squadron)
 Centro Informazioni Geotopografiche Aeronautiche (Air Force Geo-topographic Information Center - CIGA), at Pratica di Mare Air Base
 Centro Nazionale Meteorologia e Climatologia Aeronautica (Air Force National Meteorological and Climatological Center - CNMCA), at Pratica di Mare Air Base
 Centro Operativo per la Meteorologia (Meteorological Operational Center - COMET), at Pratica di Mare Air Base

Combat Forces Command 

 Comando delle Forze da Combattimento (Combat Forces Command), in Milan
 Comando Aeroporto Aviano (Aviano Air Base Command)
 Gruppo Servizi Tecnico-Operativi (Technical Services Squadron)
 Gruppo Protezione delle Forze (Force Protection Squadron)
  313° Gruppo Addestramento Acrobatico (313th Acrobatic Training Squadron – Frecce Tricolori), at Rivolto Air Base with MB-339PAN, planned to be replaced by T-345A Trainer
 Squadriglia Collegamenti Linate (Communication Flight Linate), at Linate Air Base with NH-500E helicopters and S.208M planes
 Distaccamento Aeroportuale Piacenza (Airport Detachment Piacenza)
 Italian Air Force Delegation, at Holloman Air Force Base (USA)
 Italian Air Force Delegation, at Moody Air Force Base (USA)
  2° Stormo "Mario D'Agostini" (2nd Wing), at Rivolto Air Base
 Gruppo Missili (Missile Squadron) with Spada Air-defence systems with Aspide 2000 missiles (to be replaced with CAMM-ER missiles)
 80° Gruppo OCU (Missile Systems Operational Conversion Squadron)
 402° Gruppo Servizi Tecnico-Operativi (402nd Technical Services Squadron)
 502° Gruppo Servizi Logistico-Operativi (502nd Logistic Services Squadron)
 Compagnia Protezione delle Forze (Force Protection Company)
  4° Stormo "Amedeo d'Aosta" (4th Wing), at Grosseto Air Base
 9° Gruppo Caccia (9th Fighter Squadron) with Eurofighter Typhoon
 20° Gruppo OCU Caccia (20th Fighter Operational Conversion Squadron) with Eurofighter Typhoon (Twin-seat variant)
 404° Gruppo Servizi Tecnico-Operativi (404th Technical Services Squadron)
 504° Gruppo Servizi Logistico-Operativi (504th Logistic Services Squadron)
 904° Gruppo Efficienza Aeromobili (904th Maintenance Squadron)
 Gruppo Protezione delle Forze (Force Protection Squadron)
  6° Stormo "Alfredo Fusco" (6th Wing), at Ghedi Air Base
 102° Gruppo OCU/CBOC (102nd Operational Conversion/All-weather Fighter-Bomber Squadron) with Tornado IDS (the entire wing to be reequipped with F-35A Lightning II)
 154° Gruppo CBOC/CRO (154th All-weather Fighter-Bomber/All-weather Reconnaissance Fighter Squadron) with Tornado IDS
 155° Gruppo ETS (155th Electronic Warfare Tactical Suppression Squadron) with Tornado ECR
 406° Gruppo Servizi Tecnico-Operativi (406th Technical Services Squadron)
 506° Gruppo Servizi Logistico-Operativi (506th Logistic Services Squadron)
 906° Gruppo Efficienza Aeromobili (904th Maintenance Squadron)
 Gruppo Protezione delle Forze (Force Protection Squadron)
  32° Stormo "Armando Boetto" (32nd Wing), at Amendola Air Base
 13° Gruppo (13th Squadron) with F-35A Lightning II
 28° Gruppo APR (28th Unmanned Aerial Vehicle Squadron) with MQ-1C Predator A+ and MQ-9A Predator B
 61° Gruppo APR (61st Unmanned Aerial Vehicle Squadron) with MQ-1C Predator A+, forward based, at Sigonella Air Base (will receive P.1HH HammerHead UAVs)
 432° Gruppo Servizi Tecnico-Operativi (432nd Technical Services Squadron)
 532° Gruppo Servizi Logistico-Operativi (532nd Logistic Services Squadron)
 932° Gruppo Efficienza Aeromobili (932nd Maintenance Squadron)
 632^ Squadriglia Collegamenti (632nd Liaison Flight) with MB-339A and MB-339CDII for UAV-pilot training
 Gruppo Protezione delle Forze (Force Protection Squadron)
 Distaccamento Aeronautico Jacotenente (Aeronautical Detachment Jacotenente)
  36° Stormo "Riccardo Hellmuth Seidl" (36th Wing), at Gioia del Colle Air Base
 10° Gruppo Caccia (10th Fighter Squadron) with Eurofighter Typhoon
 12° Gruppo Caccia (12th Fighter Squadron) with Eurofighter Typhoon
 436° Gruppo Servizi Tecnico-Operativi (436th Technical Services Squadron)
 536° Gruppo Servizi Logistico-Operativi (536th Logistic Services Squadron)
 936° Gruppo Efficienza Aeromobili (936th Maintenance Squadron)
 Gruppo Protezione delle Forze (Force Protection Squadron)
  37° Stormo "Cesare Toschi" (37th Wing), at Trapani Air Base
 18° Gruppo Caccia (18th Fighter Squadron) Eurofighter Typhoon
 437° Gruppo Servizi Tecnico-Operativi (437th Technical Services Squadron)
 537° Gruppo Servizi Logistico-Operativi (537th Logistic Services Squadron)
 937° Gruppo Efficienza Aeromobili (937th Maintenance Squadron)
 Gruppo Protezione delle Forze (Force Protection Squadron)
 Distaccamento Aeroportuale Pantelleria (Airport Detachment Pantelleria)
 Distaccamento Aeronautico Lampedusa (Aeronautical Detachment Lampedusa)
  51° Stormo "Ferruccio Serafini" (51st Wing), at Istrana Air Base
 132° Gruppo CIO/CBR (132nd mixed Squadron) with AMX, AMX-T and Eurofighter Typhoon
 451° Gruppo Servizi Tecnico-Operativi (451st Technical Services Squadron)
 551° Gruppo Servizi Logistico-Operativi (551st Logistic Services Squadron)
 951° Gruppo Efficienza Aeromobili (951st Maintenance Squadron)
 Gruppo Protezione delle Forze (Force Protection Squadron)
 Distaccamento Aeroportuale San Nicolò (Airport Detachment San Nicolò)

Airlift and Support Forces Command 
 

 Comando delle Forze per la mobilità e il Supporto (Airlift and Support Forces Command), at Centocelle Airport
 Comando Aeroporto Capodichino (Capodichino Air Base Command), supporting Naval Support Activity Naples home of the United States Sixth Fleet
 Gruppo Servizi Tecnico-Operativi (Technical Services Squadron)
 Gruppo Servizi Logistico-Operativi (Logistic Services Squadron)
 Compagnia Protezione delle Forze (Force Protection Company)
 Comando Aeroporto Sigonella (Sigonella Air Base Command), supporting Naval Air Station Sigonella and the 41st (Anti-submarine) Wing
 Italian Air Force Delegation, at NATO Air Base Geilenkirchen (Germany), at NATO's E-3A Component
 Italian Air Force Delegation, at Little Rock Air Force Base (USA), at the US Air Force's 19th Airlift Wing (C-130J Super Hercules training)
 Italian Air Force Delegation, at RAF Brize Norton (UK), at the Royal Air Force's No. 2 Group RAF
 Italian Air Force Delegation, at the European Tactical Airlift Centre (ETAC), at Zaragoza Air Base (Spain)
  14° Stormo "Sergio Sartof" (14th Wing), at Pratica di Mare Air Base
 8° Gruppo (8th Squadron) with 4× KC-767 tankers
 71° Gruppo (71st Electronic Warfare Squadron) with G550CAEW, P.180 Avanti
 914° Gruppo Efficienza Aeromobili (914th Maintenance Squadron)
 Centro Addestramento Equipaggi (Crew Training Center)
  15° Stormo "Stefano Cagna" (15th Search and Rescue Wing), at Cervia Air Base
 23° Gruppo Volo (23rd Squadron) with AW-101A helicopters
 80° Centro CSAR (80th Combat Search and Rescue Center), at Decimomannu Air Base with AW-139A helicopters
 81° Centro Addestramento Equipaggi (81st Crew Training Center), at Cervia Air Base with AW-139A and AW-101A helicopters
 82° Centro CSAR (82nd Combat Search and Rescue Center), at Trapani Air Base with AW-139A helicopters
 83° Gruppo CSAR (83rd Combat Search and Rescue Squadron), at Cervia Air Base with AW-139A helicopters
 84° Centro CSAR (84th Combat Search and Rescue Center), at Gioia del Colle Air Base with AW-139A helicopters
 85° Centro CSAR (85th Combat Search and Rescue Center), at Pratica di Mare Air Base with AW-139A helicopters
 415° Gruppo Servizi Tecnico-Operativi (415th Technical Services Squadron)
 515° Gruppo Servizi Logistico-Operativi (515th Logistic Services Squadron)
 915° Gruppo Efficienza Aeromobili (915th Maintenance Squadron)
 Gruppo Protezione delle Forze (Force Protection Squadron)
  16° Stormo Protezione delle Forze (16th Force Protection Wing), at Martina Franca Air Base
 Battaglione Fucilieri dell'Aria (Air-Fusiliers Battalion)
 Gruppo Addestramento STO/FP (Survive to Operate / Force Protection Training Squadron)
 Centro Cinofili dell’Aeronautica Militare (Air Force Canine Center), at Grosseto Air Base
 416° Gruppo Servizi Tecnico-Operativi (916th Technical Services Squadron)
 516° Gruppo Servizi Logistico-Operativi (916th Logistic Services Squadron)
  31° Stormo "Carmelo Raiti" (31st Wing), at Rome Ciampino Airport
 93° Gruppo (93rd Squadron) with 3× A319CJ, 2× Falcon 50
 306° Gruppo (306th Squadron) with 1× Falcon 900EX, 2× Falcon 900EASy, 4× VH-139A
 431° Gruppo Servizi Tecnico-Operativi (431st Technical Services Squadron)
 531° Gruppo Servizi Logistico-Operativi (531st Logistic Services Squadron)
 931° Gruppo Efficienza Aeromobili (931st Maintenance Squadron)
 Centro Addestramento Equipaggi (Crew Training Center)
 Gruppo Protezione delle Forze (Force Protection Squadron)
  46ª Brigata Aerea "Silvio Angelucci"  (46th Air Brigade), at Pisa Air Base (:it:46ª Brigata aerea "Silvio Angelucci")
 2° Gruppo (2nd Squadron) with C-130J Super Hercules
 50° Gruppo (50th Squadron) with C-130J-30 Super Hercules
 98° Gruppo (98th Squadron) with C-27J Spartan, EC-27J Jedi, MC-27J Praetorian
 446° Gruppo Servizi Tecnico-Operativi (446th Technical Services Squadron)
 546° Gruppo Servizi Logistico-Operativi (546th Logistic Services Squadron)
 946° Gruppo Efficienza Aeromobili (946th Maintenance Squadron)
 Centro Addestramento Equipaggi (Crew Training Center)
 Gruppo Protezione delle Forze (Force Protection Squadron)
 Distaccamento Aeroportuale Sarzana Luni (Airport Detachment Sarzana Luni)

1st Special Operations Air Brigade 

  1ª Brigata Aerea Operazioni Speciali "Vezio Mezzetti" (1st Special Operations Air Brigade), at Furbara Air Base
  9° Stormo "Francesco Baracca" (9th Combat Search and Rescue Wing), at Grazzanise Air Base
 21° Gruppo Volo (21st Squadron) with AB-212 helicopters (to be replaced with AW-101A helicopters)
 Gruppo Fucilieri dell'Aria (Air-Fusiliers Squadron)
 909° Gruppo Efficienza Aeromobili (909th Maintenance Squadron)
  17° Stormo Incursori (17th Raider Wing), at Furbara Air Base (Tier-1 Special Forces)
 Gruppo Operativo (Operational Squadron)
 Gruppo Addestramento (Training Squadron)
 Gruppo Servizi di Supporto (Support Services Squadron)
 Compagnia Protezione delle Forze (Force Protection Company)

Air Fleet Command Organization 2022 Graphic

Air Force Logistic Command 
The Air Force Logistic Command provides operational units with all the required necessary logistics, combat support and service support functions.

 Comando Logistico dell'Aeronautica Militare (Air Force Logistic Command), in Rome
 2ª Divisione – Supporto Tecnico Operativo Aeromobili, Armamento e Avionica (2nd Division – Aircraft, Armaments and Avionics Support), in Rome
 3ª Divisione – Supporto Tecnico Operativo Sistemi Comando e Controllo, Comunicazioni e Telematica (3rd Division – Command and Control, Communication e IT Support), in Rome
 Servizio dei Supporti (Support Service), in Rome
 Servizio di Commissariato e Amministrazione (Commissariat and Administration Service), in Rome
 Servizio Infrastrutture (Infrastructure Service), in Rome
 Servizio Sanitario Aeronautica Militare (Air Force Medical Service), in Rome
 Centro Sperimentale di Volo (Flight Test Center), at Pratica di Mare Air Base
 Poligono Sperimentale e di Addestramento Interforze di Salto di Quirra (Joint Test and Training Range Salto di Quirra), in Perdasdefogu

2nd Division – Aircraft, Armaments and Avionics Support 
 2ª Divisione – Supporto Tecnico Operativo Aeromobili Armamento ed Avionica (2nd Division – Aircraft, Armaments and Avionics Support), in Rome
 1° Reparto - Supporto Aeromobili (1st Department - Aircraft Support), in Rome
 1° Servizio Tecnico Distaccato (1st Technical Service Detachment), in Caselle to liaison with Finmeccanica
 2° Servizio Tecnico Distaccato (2nd Technical Service Detachment), in Turin to liaison with Leonardo S.p.A.
 3° Servizio Tecnico Distaccato (3rd Technical Service Detachment), in Villanova d'Albenga to liaison with Piaggio Aerospace
 4° Servizio Tecnico Distaccato (4th Technical Service Detachment), in Samarate to liaison with AgustaWestland
 5° Servizio Tecnico Distaccato (5th Technical Service Detachment), in Venezia Tessera
 6° Servizio Tecnico Distaccato (6th Technical Service Detachment), in Venegono Superiore to liaison with Alenia Aermacchi
 7° Servizio Tecnico Distaccato (7th Technical Service Detachment), in Barlassina
 8° Servizio Tecnico Distaccato (8th Technical Service Detachment), in Campi Bisenzio to liaison with SELEX Galileo
 9° Servizio Tecnico Distaccato (9th Technical Service Detachment), in Foligno to liaison with Officine Meccaniche Aeronautiche
 10° Servizio Tecnico Distaccato (10th Technical Service Detachment), in Pomezia to liaison with Leonardo and Northrop Grumman Italia
 11° Servizio Tecnico Distaccato (11th Technical Service Detachment), in Frosinone to liaison with AgustaWestland
 12° Servizio Tecnico Distaccato (12th Technical Service Detachment), in Capodichino to liaison with Tecnam
 13° Servizio Tecnico Distaccato (13th Technical Service Detachment), in Brindisi to liaison with Alenia Aeronautica, AgustaWestland and Avio
 2° Reparto - Supporto Sistemi Avionici e Armamento (2nd Department - Avionic and Armaments Support), in Rome
 Centro Polifunzionale Velivoli Aerotattici (Multifunctional Tactical Aircraft Center - CEPVA), at Cameri Air Base
 Comando Aeroporto di Cameri (Cameri Air Base Command)
 Gruppo Servizi Tecnico-Operativi (Technical Services Squadron)
 Gruppo Servizi Logistico-Operativi (Logistic Services Squadron)
 Plotone Protezione delle Forze (Force Protection Platoon)
 Nucleo Iniziale di Formazione (NIF) JSF (Initial JSF/F-35 Formation Unit)
 1° Reparto Manutenzione Velivoli (1st Aircraft Maintenance Regiment) responsible for Tornado and Eurofighter Typhoon
 2° Reparto Manutenzione Missili (2nd Missile Maintenance Regiment), at Padua Air Base responsible for air-launched and ground-launched missiles
 Centro Manutenzione Armamento (Weapons Maintenance Center)
 Gruppo Servizi Generali (General Services Squadron)
 Plotone Protezione delle Forze (Force Protection Platoon)
 3° Reparto Manutenzione Velivoli (3rd Aircraft Maintenance Regiment), at Istrana Air Base responsible for AMX
 5° Gruppo Manutenzione Velivoli (5th Aircraft Maintenance Squadron), at Capodichino Air Base responsible for air ground equipment
 6° Reparto Manutenzione Elicotteri (6th Helicopter Maintenance Regiment), at Pratica di Mare Air Base responsible for helicopters and P.180 Avanti
 10° Reparto Manutenzione Velivoli (10th Aircraft Maintenance Regiment), at Galatina Air Base responsible for MB-339 and T-345A Trainer
 11° Reparto Manutenzione Velivoli (11th Aircraft Maintenance Regiment), at Sigonella Air Base responsible for P-72A ASW
 Centro Logistico Polivalente (Multi-use Logistic Center), at Guidonia Air Base
 Gruppo Logistica e Rifornimenti (Logistic and Supply Squadron)
 Gruppo Calibrazione e Sopravvivenza (Calibration and Survival Squadron)
 Centro Logistico Munizionamento e Armamento Aeronautica Militare (Air Force Ammunition and Weapons Logistic Center), in Orte
 Gruppo Logistica e Rifornimenti (Logistic and Supply Squadron)
 Gruppo Efficienza Materiale Armamento (Weapons Materiel Efficiency Squadron)
 Gruppo Servizi Generali (General Services Squadron)
 Compagnia Protezione delle Forze (Force Protection Company)
 Gruppo Rifornimento Area Nord (Supply Squadron Nord), in Sanguinetto
 Gruppo Rifornimento Area Sud (Supply Squadron South), in Francavilla Fontana
 Italian Air Force Delegation, at the International Eurofighter Support Team, at BAE Systems Military Air & Information, in Warton (UK)
 Italian Air Force Delegation, at the International Eurofighter Support Team, at EADS CASA, in Madrid (Spain)
 Italian Air Force Delegation, at the International Eurofighter Support Team and International Weapon System Support Centre, at  Eurofighter GmbH, in Hallbergmoos (Germany)
 Italian Air Force Delegation, at the C-130J program, at Wright-Patterson Air Force Base, in Dayton (USA)

3rd Division – Command and Control, Communication e IT Support 

 3ª Divisione – Supporto Tecnico Operativo Sistemi Comando e Controllo, Comunicazioni e Telematica (3rd Division – Command and Control, Communication e IT Support), in Rome
 1° Reparto - Sistemi Difesa Aerea, Assistenza al Volo, Telecomunicazioni (1st Department - Air-defence, Flight Support, and Communication Systems)
 2° Reparto - Sistemi Automatizzati (2nd Department - Automatic Systems) providing hardware and software support
 Reparto Gestione ed Innovazione Sistemi Comando e Controllo (Command and Control Systems Maintenance and Innovation Regiment - ReGISCC), at Pratica di Mare Air Base (Manages the air force's classified communication network)
 Gruppo Gestione Sistemi Comando e Controllo (Command and Control Systems Management Squadron)
 Gruppo Innovazione, Sviluppo e Sperimentazione C4-ISR (C4-ISR Innovations, Development and Experimentation Squadron)
 Reparto Sistemi Informativi Automatizzati (Automatic Information Systems Regiment - ReSIA), in Acquasanta

4th Communication and Air-defence Systems and Flight Support Brigade 
 4ª Brigata Telecomunicazioni e Sistemi per la Difesa Aerea e l’Assistenza al Volo (4th Communication and Air-defence Systems and Flight Support Brigade - 4ª Brigata TLC e Sist. DA/AV), at Latina Air Base
 Gruppo Addestramento e Formazione TLC e Sist. DA/AV (Training and Formation Squadron)
 Compagnia Protezione delle Forze (Force Protection Company)
 1° Reparto Tecnico Comunicazioni (1st Technical Communications Regiment), in Milan
 Gruppo Manutenzione (Maintenance Squadron)
 Squadriglia TLC (Communications Flight), at Decimomannu Air Base
 Squadriglia TLC (Communications Flight), at Padua Air Base
 Centro Aeronautica Militare di Montagna (Air Force Mountain Center) on Monte Cimone
 2° Reparto Tecnico Comunicazioni (2nd Technical Communications Regiment), at Bari Air Base
 Gruppo Manutenzione (Maintenance Squadron)
 Squadriglia TLC (Communications Flight), at Ciampino Air Base
 Centro Tecnico per la Meteorologia (Meteorology Technical Center), at Vigna di Valle Airport
 112ª Squadriglia Radar Remota (112th Remote Radar Station Flight), in Mortara
 113ª Squadriglia Radar Remota (113th Remote Radar Station Flight), in Lame di Concordia
 114ª Squadriglia Radar Remota (114th Remote Radar Station Flight), in Potenza Picena
 115ª Squadriglia Radar Remota (115th Remote Radar Station Flight), in Capo Mele
 121ª Squadriglia Radar Remota (121st Remote Radar Station Flight), in Poggio Ballone
 123ª Squadriglia Radar Remota (123rd Remote Radar Station Flight), in Capo Frasca
 131ª Squadriglia Radar Remota (131st Remote Radar Station Flight), in Jacotenente
 132ª Squadriglia Radar Remota (132nd Remote Radar Station Flight), in Capo Rizzuto
 133ª Squadriglia Radar Remota (133rd Remote Radar Station Flight), in San Giovanni Teatino
 134ª Squadriglia Radar Remota (134th Remote Radar Station Flight), in Lampedusa
 135ª Squadriglia Radar Remota (135th Remote Radar Station Flight), in Marsala
 136ª Squadriglia Radar Remota (136th Remote Radar Station Flight), in Otranto
 137ª Squadriglia Radar Remota (137th Remote Radar Station Flight), in Mezzogregorio

Services 
 Servizio dei Supporti (Support Service), in Rome
 1° Reparto – Supporto Operativo (1st Department - Operational Support), in Rome
 3° Stormo, at Villafranca Air Base (Out of area air base construction, management and support wing)
 Gruppo Servizi Generali (General Services Squadron)
 Gruppo Mobile Supporto Operativo (Mobile Operational Support Squadron)
 Gruppo Servizi di Supporto Operativo (Operational Support Services Squadron)
 Gruppo Autotrasporti (Transport Squadron)
 Gruppo Protezione delle Forze (Force Protection Squadron)
 Centro Addestrativo Personale Fuori Area (Out of Area Personnel Training Center)
 Centro Tecnico Rifornimenti (Technical Supply Center), at Fiumicino Air Base
 1° Gruppo Ricezione e Smistamento (GRS) (1st Reception and Sorting Squadron), in Novara
 2° Gruppo Manutenzione Autoveicoli (2nd Motor-vehicles Maintenance Squadron), in Forlì
 3° Gruppo Manutenzione Autoveicoli (3rd Motor-vehicles Maintenance Squadron), in Mungivacca
 Comando Rete POL (Petroil Oil Lubricant) (POL Network Command), at Parma Air Base manages NATO's North Italian Pipeline System
 2° Reparto – Servizio Chimico-Fisico (2nd Department - Chemical-Physical Service), in Rome
 1° Laboratorio Tecnico di Controllo, at Padua Air Base
 2° Laboratorio Tecnico di Controllo, at Fiumicino Air Base
 3° Laboratorio Tecnico di Controllo, in Mungivacca
 4° Laboratorio Tecnico di Controllo, at Parma Air Base
 5° Laboratorio Tecnico di Controllo, at Decimomannu Air Base
 6° Laboratorio Tecnico di Controllo, at Trapani Air Base
 Distaccamento Aeroportuale di Brindisi (Airport Detachment Brindisi
 Gruppo Servizi Generali (General Services Squadron)
 Compagnia Protezione delle Forze (Force Protection Company)
 Italian Air Force Delegation, at MoD Bicester (UK)
 Italian Air Force Delegation, at the German Air Force's Weapon System Support Center 1, in Erding (Germany) (Turbo-Union RB199 and Eurojet EJ200 engines maintenance)
 Italian Air Force Delegation, at Torrejón Air Base (Spain)
 Servizio di Commissariato e Amministrazione (Commissariat and Administration Service), in Rome
 1° Reparto – Commissariato (1st Department - Commissariat), provisioning, clothing, personal equipment department
 2° Reparto – Amministrazione (2nd Department - Administration), human resources department
 Servizio Infrastrutture (Infrastructure Service), in Rome
 1° Reparto – Programmi (1st Department - Planning)
 2° Reparto – Lavori (2nd Department - Construction)
 1° Reparto Genio Aeronautica Militare (1st Air Force Engineer Regiment), at Villafranca Air Base
 27° Gruppo Genio Campale (27th Field Engineer Squadron), at Villafranca Air Base
 102° Servizio Tecnico Distaccato Infrastrutture (102nd Detached Infrastructure Technical Service), at Ghedi Air Base
 106° Servizio Tecnico Distaccato Infrastrutture (106th Detached Infrastructure Technical Service), at Parma Air Base
 108° Servizio Tecnico Distaccato Infrastrutture (108th Detached Infrastructure Technical Service), at Istrana Air Base
 113° Servizio Tecnico Distaccato Infrastrutture (113th Detached Infrastructure Technical Service), in Poggio Renatico
 2° Reparto Genio Aeronautica Militare (2nd Air Force Engineer Regiment), at Ciampino Air Base
 8° Gruppo Genio Campale (8th Field Engineer Squadron), at Ciampino Air Base
 201° Servizio Tecnico Distaccato Infrastrutture (201st Detached Infrastructure Technical Service), at Pisa Air Base
 205° Servizio Tecnico Distaccato Infrastrutture (205th Detached Infrastructure Technical Service), at Decimomannu Air Base
 208° Servizio Tecnico Distaccato Infrastrutture (208th Detached Infrastructure Technical Service), at Pratica di Mare Air Base
 209° Servizio Tecnico Distaccato Infrastrutture (209th Detached Infrastructure Technical Service), at Grosseto Air Base
 3° Reparto Genio Aeronautica Militare (3rd Air Force Engineer Regiment), at Bari Air Base
 16° Gruppo Genio Campale (16th Field Engineer Squadron), at Bari Air Base
 301° Servizio Tecnico Distaccato Infrastrutture (301st Detached Infrastructure Technical Service), at Amendola Air Base
 302° Servizio Tecnico Distaccato Infrastrutture (302nd Detached Infrastructure Technical Service), at Gioia del Colle Air Base
 304° Servizio Tecnico Distaccato Infrastrutture (304th Detached Infrastructure Technical Service), at Sigonella Air Base
 308° Servizio Tecnico Distaccato Infrastrutture (308th Detached Infrastructure Technical Service), in Pozzuoli
 Servizio Sanitario Aeronautica Militare (Air Force Medical Service), in Rome
 Commissione Sanitaria di Appello (Medical Examination Commission), in Rome
 Istituto Perfezionamento Addestramento Medicina Aeronautica e Spaziale (Aeronautical and Space Medicine Training Institute), in Rome
 Infermeria Principale (Main Pharmacy), at Pratica di Mare Air Base
 Istituto di Medicina Aerospaziale dell'A.M. di Milano (Air Force Medical Institute, Milan)
 Istituto di Medicina Aerospaziale dell'A.M. di Roma (Air Force Medical Institute, Rome)
 Centro Aeromedico Psicofisiologico (Air-medical Psychophysiological Center), at Bari Air Base
 Dipartimento Militare di Medicina Legale dell'Aeronautica Militare (Air Force Forensic Medicine Military Department), at Bari Air Base

Flight Test Center 

 Centro Sperimentale di Volo (Flight Test Center), at Pratica di Mare Air Base
  Reparto Sperimentale Volo (Test Flight Department)
 311° Gruppo Volo (311th Squadron) with various types of aircraft
 Gruppo Tecnico (Technical Squadron)
 Gruppo Gestione Software (Software Management Squadron)
 Gruppo Ingegneria per l’Aero-Spazio (Aero-Space Engineering Squadron)
 Gruppo Armamento e Contromisure (Weapons and Countermeasures Squadron)
 Reparto Tecnologie Materiali Aeronautici e Spaziali (Air and Space Technologies and Materials Department - RTMAS)
 Gruppo Materiali Strutturali (Structural Materials Squadron)
 Gruppo Materiali di Consumo (Fuel Materials Squadron)
 Gruppo Indagini Balistiche (Ballistic Research Squadron)
 Gruppo Indagini Tecniche (Technical Research Squadron)
 Gruppo Analisi e prove Chimiche e Fisiche (Chemical and Physical Analysis and Test Squadron)
 Reparto Medicina Aeronautica e Spaziale (Air and Space Medicine Department - RMAS)
 Gruppo Alta Quota ed Ambienti Estremi (High Altitude and Extreme Environments Squadron)
 Gruppo Biodinamica (Biodynamic Squadron)
 Gruppo Fattori Umani (Human Factor Squadron)
 Italian Air Force Delegation, at the École du personnel navigant d'essais et de réception (EPNER), at Istres-Le Tubé Air Base (France)

Joint Test and Training Range 
 Poligono Sperimentale e di Addestramento Interforze di Salto di Quirra (Joint Test and Training Range Salto di Quirra), in Perdasdefogu
 Gruppo Impiego Operativo (Operational Squadron) with NH-500E and AB-212 helicopters (the latter to be replaced with AW-139A)
 Gruppo Servizi Logistico-Operativi (Logistic Services Squadron)]
 Reparto Sperimentale e di Standardizzazione al Tiro Aereo (Air Firing Test and Standardization Regiment), at Decimomannu Air Base
 Gruppo Servizi Tecnico-Operativi (Technical Services Squadron)
 Gruppo Servizi Logistico-Operativi (Logistic Services Squadron)
 Centro Aeronautica Militare Sperimentale e di Standardizzazione al Tiro Aereo (Air Force Air Firing Test and Standardization Center)
 Compagnia Protezione delle Forze (Force Protection Company)
 Distaccamento Capo San Lorenzo (Capo San Lorenzo Detachment), in Villaputzu
 Poligono Capo Frasca (Capo Frasca Training Range), in Arbus

1st Air Region 

The 1st Air Region provides territorial functions and liaisons with communal, provincial and regional administrations, in the North of Italy.

 1ª Regione Aerea (1st Air Region), in Milan
 Comando Aeroporto / Quartier Generale della 1ª Regione Aerea - Linate (Air Base Command / Headquarters 1st Air Region), at Linate Air Base
 Gruppo Servizi Tecnico-Operativi (Technical Services Squadron)
 Gruppo Servizi Logistico-Operativi (Logistic Services Squadron)
 Compagnia Protezione delle Forze (Force Protection Company)
 Centro Logistico di Supporto Areale / Istituto “U. Maddalena” (Area Logistic Support Center / "U. Maddalena" Institute), in Cadimare
 Istituto "Umberto Maddalena" ("Umberto Maddalena" High School)
 Gruppo Servizi Generali (General Services Squadron)
 Distaccamento Aeronautica Militare di Capo Mele (Air Force Detachment Capo Mele)
 Distaccamento Aeroportuale Dobbiaco (Airport Detachment Toblach)

Air Force Schools Command - 3rd Air Region 

The Air Force Schools Command - 3rd Air Region is based in Bari and responsible for the formation and training of all members of the Aeronautica Militare, and also provides territorial functions and liaisons with communal, provincial and regional administrations in the South of Italy.

 Comando Scuole dell'Aeronautica Militare - 3ª Regione Aerea (Air Force Schools Command - 3rd Air Region CSAM/3ªRA), in Bari
 Accademia Aeronautica (Air Force Academy), in Pozzuoli
 Reparto Servizi Tecnici Generali (General Technical Services Regiment)
 Gruppo Servizi Tecnici (Technical Services Squadron)
 Gruppo Servizi Vari (Various Services Squadron)
 Gruppo Telematico (Telematic Squadron)
 Plotone Protezione delle Forze (Force Protection Platoon)
 Centro di Formazione Aviation English (Aviation English Formation Center), in Loreto
 Gruppo Servizi Generali (General Services Squadron)
 Plotone Protezione delle Forze (Force Protection Platoon)
 Istituto di Scienze Militari Aeronautiche (Military Aeronautical Sciences Institute), in Florence
 Reparto Servizi Tecnici Generali (General Technical Services Regiment)
 Gruppo Servizi Tecnici (Technical Services Squadron)
 Gruppo Servizi Vari (Various Services Squadron)
 Plotone Protezione delle Forze (Force Protection Platoon)
 Scuola Militare Aeronautica Giulio Douhet (Military Aeronautical High School Giulio Douhet), in Florence
 Scuola Marescialli Aeronautica Militare / Comando Aeroporto Viterbo (Air Force Non Commissioned Officers School / Airport Command Viterbo), in Viterbo
 Gruppo Servizi Generali (General Services Squadron)
 Plotone Protezione delle Forze (Force Protection Platoon)
 Scuola Specialisti Aeronautica Militare (Air Force Specialists School), in Caserta
 Gruppo Servizi Generali (General Services Squadron)
 Plotone Protezione delle Forze (Force Protection Platoon)
 Scuola Volontari Aeronautica Militare (Air Force Volunteers School), in Taranto
 Gruppo Servizi Generali (General Services Squadron)
 Plotone Protezione delle Forze (Force Protection Platoon)
 Scuola di Aerocooperazione (Air-cooperation School – an inter-service coordination & training center), in Guidonia Montecelio (50% air force staffed)
 Vice Comandante (Air Force Schools Command - Deputy Commander)
 Quartier Generale CSAM/3ªRA (Headquarters CSAM/3ªRA), in Bari
 Gruppo Servizi Tecnico-Operativi (Technical Services Squadron)
 Gruppo Servizi Logistico-Operativi (Logistic Services Squadron)
 Plotone Protezione delle Forze (Force Protection Platoon)
 Centro di Selezione Aeronautica Militare (Air Force Selection Center), in Guidonia Montecelio
 Distaccamento Aeroportuale Alghero (Airport Detachment Alghero)
 Distaccamento Aeronautico Monte Scuro (Aeronautical Detachment Monte Scuro)
 Centro di Sopravvivenza, in Montagna (Mountain Survival Center)
 Distaccamento Aeronautico Otranto (Aeronautical Detachment Otranto)
 Distaccamento Aeronautico Siracusa (Aeronautical Detachment Syracuse)
 Centro Addestramento Equipaggi - Multi Crew (Crew Training Center - Multi Crew, for other armed services, police forces, and government agencies), at Pratica di Mare Air Base 
 204° Gruppo Volo (204th Squadron) with P.180 Avanti
 Gruppo Istruzione Professionale (Professional Training Squadron)
 Italian Air Force Delegation, at Kalamata Air Base (Greece), at the Hellenic Air Force's 120th Training Wing
 Italian Air Force Delegation, at Sheppard Air Force Base (USA), at the Euro-NATO Joint Jet Pilot Training Programm
  60° Stormo (60th (Glider) Wing), in Guidonia Montecelio
 Gruppo di Volo a Vela (Glider Squadron) with G103 Twin Astir II, Nimbus-4D, Nimbus 4M and LAK-17A gliders, S.208M, MB-339A and MB-339CDII planes, and NH-500E helicopters
 460° Gruppo Servizi Tecnico-Operativi (460th Technical Services Squadron)
 560° Gruppo Servizi Logistico-Operativi (560th Logistic Services Squadron)
 Servizio Efficienza Aeromobili (Maintenance Service)
 Compagnia Protezione delle Forze (Force Protection Company)
  61° Stormo (61st (Jet Training) Wing), at Galatina Air Base
 212° Gruppo Volo (212nd Squadron) with M-346A Master
 213° Gruppo Volo (213rd Squadron) with MB-339CDII, being replaced by T-345A Trainer
 214° Gruppo Volo (214th Squadron) training navigators and weapon officers MB-339A, planned to be replaced by T-345A Trainer
 461° Gruppo Servizi Tecnico-Operativi (461st Technical Services Squadron)
 561° Gruppo Servizi Logistico-Operativi (561st Logistic Services Squadron)
 961° Gruppo Efficienza Aeromobili (961st Maintenance Squadron)
 Compagnia Protezione delle Forze (Force Protection Company)
 Italian Air Force Delegation, at Cazaux Air Base (France), at the French Air Force's 8e Escadre de Chasse
  70° Stormo Giulio Cesare Graziani (70th (Basic Training) Wing), at Latina Air Base
 207° Gruppo Volo (207th Squadron) with SF.260EA and P.180 Avanti
 Gruppo Istruzione Professionale (Professional Training Squadron)
 470° Gruppo Servizi Tecnico-Operativi (470th Technical Services Squadron)
 570° Gruppo Servizi Logistico-Operativi (570th Logistic Services Squadron)
 970° Gruppo Efficienza Aeromobili (970th Maintenance Squadron)
 Compagnia Protezione delle Forze (Force Protection Company)
  72° Stormo (72nd (Helicopter Training) Wing), at Frosinone Air Base
 208° Gruppo Volo (208th Squadron) with NH-500E and AW-139A
 Gruppo Istruzione Professionale (Professional Training Squadron)
 472° Gruppo Servizi Tecnico-Operativi (472nd Technical Services Squadron)
 572° Gruppo Servizi Logistico-Operativi (572nd Logistic Services Squadron)
 972° Gruppo Efficienza Aeromobili (972nd Maintenance Squadron)
 Compagnia Protezione delle Forze (Force Protection Company)

Air Force Structure Graphic

See also 
 Military of Italy
 Carabinieri
 Guardia di Finanza
 Italian Army
 Italian Navy
 Structure of the Italian Army

References

External links 
 Aeronautica Militare web page

Military units and formations established in 1923
 
Aeronautica Militare
1923 establishments in Italy
Structure of contemporary air forces